Line U. Hansen, (born 7 May 1983 in Odense) is a professional squash player who represents Denmark. She reached a career-high world ranking of World No. 18 in October 2013.

References

External links 

Danish female squash players
Living people
1983 births
Sportspeople from Odense